Dempsey and Rowe refers to the duo of John Dempsey (playwright and lyricist) and Dana P. Rowe (composer). They have written six musicals: The Reluctant Dragon, Zombie Prom (1996), The Fix (1997), The Witches of Eastwick (2000), Brother Russia (2012) and Blackbeard (2019).

The Fix (1997)

The Fix premiered at the Donmar Warehouse in April 1997 under the direction of Sam Mendes. Its working title was "Cal: A Musical Tale of Relative Insanity". After mixed critical reception, the material were rewritten and the tone made more comic. The revised version, featuring an expanded, bolder orchestration, premiered at the Signature Theatre, Arlington.

The Witches of Eastwick (2000)

Previewing from 24 June 2000 and opening on 18 July 2000 at the Theatre Royal Drury Lane, The Witches of Eastwick was based on John Updike's novel and its film adaptation. The original cast featured Ian McShane as Darryl Van Horne, with Lucie Arnaz, Maria Friedman and Joanna Riding as the witches. Eric D. Schaeffer, the director who 'fixed' previous show, The Fix, for its American premiere, was employed to head the production.

The Witches of Eastwick transferred to the Prince of Wales Theatre on 23 March 2001, where the set design was reconceived and a new song, "The Glory of Me" added in place of Van Horne's solo, "Who's the Man?". The production closed on the 27 October 2001. The Witches of Eastwick was also produced as the season-ending musical to the Signature Theatre's 2006-2007 season, starring Marc Kudisch, Emily Skinner, Jacquelyn Piro Donovan, and Christiane Noll.

Blackbeard (2019) 
Dempsey and Rowe's musical Blackbeard opened on 18 June 2019 at the Signature Theatre, closing on 14 July. Inspired by the historical pirate, it follows Blackbeard's crew on a 'fantastical journey across the globe to raise an undead pirate army from the depths of the sea'.

References 

American musical theatre composers